The  was an electric multiple unit (EMU) commuter train type operated by the private railway operator Keihan Electric Railway in Japan from 1970 until September 2021.

Formations
The fleet consisted of seven seven-car sets (5551 to 5557), formed as follows with four motored cars and three non-powered trailer cars.

Each of the four motored ("M") cars has one scissors-type pantograph. The "M1" car is designated as a mildly air-conditioned car.

The T2 and M3 cars have a driving compartment at one end for depot shunting use, although driving controls have been removed from the two cars each in sets 5551 and 5552.

Interior
Passenger accommodation consists of longitudinal bench seating throughout.

History
First introduced in 1970, a total of 50 vehicles were built by 1980, including one car built in 1980 to replace a car damaged in a level crossing accident.

The last 5000 series train made its final run on September 4, 2021, following a postponement from June 1, 2021, due to a review of train operations.

References

External links

  

Electric multiple units of Japan
5000 series
Train-related introductions in 1970
Kawasaki multiple units